Splash! may refer to:

 Splash! (academic outreach program)
 "Splash!" (song), a 2006 song by B'z
 Splash! (festival), a hip hop and reggae festival in Germany
 Reality television series based on the Celebrity Splash! franchise
 Splash! (Chinese TV series), the official English title of a Chinese reality series
 Splash (South Korean TV series), a short-lived South Korean reality series
 Splash! (British TV series), a British reality TV series
 Splash (American TV series), an American reality series

See also
Splash (disambiguation)